Rampage is a 2009 action film written and directed by Uwe Boll and starring Brendan Fletcher, Michael Paré, Shaun Sipos and Lynda Boyd. It received a theatrical release in Germany, though was released direct-to-video in the rest of the world. It was Boll's first film to gain mainly positive reviews. The film was followed by two sequels Rampage: Capital Punishment (2014) and Rampage: President Down (2016).

Plot
In the fictional town of Tenderville, Oregon, Bill Williamson, a 23-year-old man, is living with his parents and working a low-paid job as a mechanic, feeling bombarded with the problems of the world, by ubiquitous TV sets, radios, and the outspoken political views of 21-year-old Evan Drince, who seems to be his sole friend. Bill's parents ask him to move out and Bill leaves for work, stopping to get coffee along the way, and argues with the shop owner when he is unsatisfied with his coffee. At work, his boss interrupts him while Bill is working on a personal vehicle off the clock.  The boss then condescendingly dismisses Bill's request for a raise.

Back at home, Bill prints out fake money and then constructs a suit of AR-500 steel body armor, complete with a ballistic helmet and a paintball mask. Armed with two submachine guns, two semiautomatic pistols, and two knives, he heads into the center of town. First, he incapacitates the police by car-bombing their headquarters with a remote-controlled, bomb-loaded van. He then walks through the streets, shooting people at random with the submachine guns, and stops to taunt and shoot the coffee shop owner. Two police officers open fire on him, but Bill's armor blocks the bullets and he kills both officers. He goes into a salon filled with several hiding women and takes off his mask in order to get a drink before leaving without shooting anyone, but then returns after realizing he revealed his identity to the salon occupants, all of whom he kills.

Bill goes unnoticed into a bingo parlor, orders a sandwich, harasses the host, and leaves without shooting anyone, believing the elderly patrons are already close enough to dying. He then enters a local bank, killing the security guard before shooting some of the employees and customers who attempt to subdue him. He proceeds to rob the bank, forcing the manager to empty a safe full of money into a plastic trash bag. Outside the bank, he secretly switches the money he stole with his fake money and burns the bag in a trash can, shouting that money is worthless and causes the problems of the world.

After killing a restaurant waitress to reinforce the case that Evan, who had argued with the waitress, was the killer, Bill calls Evan, who is in a forest nearby expecting him for a mano-a-mano paintball competition. Bill drives to the forest and is pursued by several police officers, led by Sheriff Melvoy. Bill kills most of the officers with explosives and flees into the forest, pursued by Melvoy, the only surviving policeman. When he arrives at the forest, Bill ambushes Melvoy, stabbing him and leaving him to die. Finding Evan, Bill immobilizes him with a stun gun and then places one of his pistols in Evan's hand, shooting him in the head to give the illusion of suicide. Bill puts the armor suit and weapons on Evan's corpse, leaves the forest, and burns remaining evidence in a barrel.

Bill then returns home before his parents arrive with horror stories about the killings in town. While they are conversing in front of the television, news stations report that they have identified the killer as Evan, and that at least 93 people have been killed in the rampage. In his room, while packing his belongings and the stolen bank money, Bill hears a local television news report that police have arrested Evan's father, an activist during the Vietnam War era, who is claiming the innocence of his son and accusing Bill of the crime. Bill fills a briefcase with the stolen money and prepares to leave. The story concludes with a home video of Bill announcing his departure on a personal quest to unknown whereabouts, to further reduce the world's population. A text indicates Bill had disappeared from that point on, and two years later, his video recording found its way onto the Internet.

Cast
 Brendan Fletcher as Bill Williamson
 Michael Paré as Sheriff Melvoy
 Shaun Sipos as Evan Drince
 Lynda Boyd as Sarah Williamson, Bill's Mom
 Robert Clarke	as Evan's Father
 Matt Frewer as Alan Williamson, Bill's Dad
 Katey Grace as Bank Teller
 Brent Hodge as Bingo Hall Server
 Katharine Isabelle as Beauty Staff #2		
 Malcolm Stewart as Bank Manager
 Pale Christian Thomas	as Gelato Server
 Michaela Mann as Waitress

Production
 Parts of Rampage were filmed in Langley, British Columbia, on a stretch of Fraser Highway that cuts directly through the city centre.

Release
While receiving a theatrical opening in Boll's native Germany, the film is a direct-to-video project in the US and was released on DVD and Blu-ray Disc on June 1, 2010, by Phase 4 Films.

Reception
Rampage received several positive reviews. Comments were made expressing surprise at the positive reviews the film received, as Uwe Boll's previous films have been poorly reviewed by critics. /Film gave the film 7 out of 10, stating "Even a broken clock is right two times a day. And it was bound to happen eventually. Uwe Boll has made a good movie. Not a great movie, but a decent film." Film.com stated 
"I can’t believe the words I’m about to type (...) Uwe Boll’s latest film (...) is good. Very good." The film received 3½ stars out of 5 from Bloody Disgusting, who praised Uwe Boll's "evolution" in style, "almost as if the German Ed Wood has taken a deep look into the mirror, reflected on his films, and made a turn for the better". 
Peter Debruge of Variety gave the film a negative review, calling it "uncompromising and nearly unwatchable (as much for its subject as for its nauseating visual style)". Scott Foy of Dread Central gave the film 3.5 stars out 5 and stated, "Uwe Boll can be a little less angry today knowing he has crafted a solid, tension-filled, original thriller about subject matter that few filmmakers would dare even touch. Congratulations, Dr. Boll, you've silenced many of your critics."

Sequels

On January 9, 2014, The Hollywood Reporter revealed that Uwe Boll had begun development of a sequel to Rampage, featuring the return of Brendan Fletcher as Bill Williamson. The plot involves Williamson holding a television station hostage as a political platform. Featured alongside Fletcher are actors Lochlyn Munro, Mike Dopud, and Michaela Ross. Natalia Tudge is the film's producer. A teaser for the film was released on January 31, 2014. The film was later revealed to be titled Rampage: Capital Punishment and was released on August 19, 2014. A third film called Rampage: President Down was released in 2016.

References

External links
 
 

2009 films
2009 action thriller films
2009 psychological thriller films
Canadian action thriller films
German action thriller films
2000s English-language films
English-language Canadian films
English-language German films
Films directed by Uwe Boll
Films set in Oregon
Films shot in British Columbia
Mass murder in fiction
Brightlight Pictures films
2000s Canadian films
2000s German films